The Emmons House is a historic house at 601 Lincoln Street in Sitka, Alaska. It is a two-story wood-frame structure, roughly  square, with a hip roof.  The house was built in 1895 by Lieutenant George T. Emmons, who became one of the foremost anthropologists of the Tlingit people.  Emmons served in Sitka for only four years, but he amassed a large number of Tlingit artifacts, and frequently returned to the area to continue his research.  This house is the only place in Alaska closely associated with his life.

The house was listed on the National Register of Historic Places in 1977.

See also
National Register of Historic Places listings in Sitka City and Borough, Alaska

References

1895 establishments in Alaska
Houses completed in 1895
Houses in Sitka, Alaska
Houses on the National Register of Historic Places in Alaska
Buildings and structures on the National Register of Historic Places in Sitka, Alaska